Willison railway station is located on the Alamein line in Victoria, Australia. It serves the eastern Melbourne suburb of Camberwell, and opened on 8 June 1908 as Golf Links. It was renamed Willison on 23 July 1936.

History
Willison station was not part of the original Outer Circle line. It was provided for the convenience of members of the Riversdale Golf Club, which was originally adjacent to the site. It has been said that influential club members did not appreciate having to walk to either Riversdale or Hartwell, and pressed for a closer alternative. That almost certainly explains why Willison was built so close to Riversdale, being only 400 metres away. The club moved from the site in 1927 and, on 23 July 1936, the station was renamed Willison, after A. J. Willison, a former member of Camberwell Council.

The station was originally served by the so-called Deepdene Dasher, which ran a shuttle on the remnant of the Outer Circle line between Ashburton and Deepdene. After the Deepdene Dasher ceased operation in 1927, the station was served by Ashburton line trains. Twelve years later, on 28 June 1948, the line was extended from Ashburton to Alamein, the service which still exists today.

In 1954, the current station platforms were provided when the line was duplicated between Riversdale and Hartwell. In 1972, both platforms were extended at the down end, and a pedestrian crossing was relocated.

During the 2018/2019 financial year, Willison was the sixth-least-used station on Melbourne's metropolitan network, with 102,600 passenger movements.

Platforms and services
Willison has two side platforms. It is served by Alamein line trains.

Platform 1:
  weekday all stations and limited express services to Flinders Street; all stations shuttle services to Camberwell

Platform 2:
  all stations services to Alamein

References

External links
 
 Melway map at street-directory.com.au

Railway stations in Melbourne
Railway stations in Australia opened in 1908
Railway stations in the City of Boroondara